This is a list of notable Jewish American psychologists.  For other Jewish Americans, see Lists of Jewish Americans.

Jewish
Psychologists
Psychologists